Luis Enrique Rojas Carpena (born July 5, 1979) is an Olympic swimmer and National Record holder from Venezuela. He swam for his native country at the 2004 Olympics. He swam collegiately in the United States, first at the University of Hawaiʻi at Mānoa (1999–2001) and then at the University of Arizona (2002–2004).

References

1979 births
Living people
20th-century Venezuelan people
21st-century Venezuelan people
People from Guanare
Venezuelan male swimmers
Arizona Wildcats men's swimmers
Hawaii Rainbow Warriors swimmers
Swimmers at the 1999 Pan American Games
Swimmers at the 2004 Summer Olympics
Swimmers at the 2007 Pan American Games
Swimmers at the 2011 Pan American Games
Olympic swimmers of Venezuela
Pan American Games bronze medalists for Venezuela
Pan American Games silver medalists for Venezuela
Pan American Games medalists in swimming
Central American and Caribbean Games gold medalists for Venezuela
Competitors at the 2006 Central American and Caribbean Games
South American Games silver medalists for Venezuela
South American Games medalists in swimming
Competitors at the 2010 South American Games
Central American and Caribbean Games medalists in swimming
Medalists at the 1999 Pan American Games
Medalists at the 2007 Pan American Games
Medalists at the 2011 Pan American Games